The 7th Air Division (7 AD) served the United States Air Force with distinction from early 1944 through early 1992, earning an outstanding unit decoration and a service streamer along the way.

History

Hawaii
As the 7th Fighter Wing, the division provided air defense of the Hawaiian Islands from 21 April 1944, assigned to VII Fighter Command, and then Army Air Forces, Pacific Ocean Areas. 15th Fighter Group and 21st Fighter Group came under the command of the wing at different times in 1944. 

On 15 December 1947 the wing was redesignated the 7 Air Division, but then inactivated on 1 May 1948. It was organized again on the same day, but then discontinued on 3 September 1948.

Strategic Air Command rotation to England
Strategic Air Command (SAC) formed two air divisions in early 1951.  The 7th Air Division was formed for its bases in England, while the 5th Air Division was and activated at Offutt Air Force Base, Nebraska, where Maj Gen Archie J. Old, Jr. formed its cadre before it moved overseas to control SAC units in Morocco. The 7th, led by Brig Gen Paul T. Cullen, was the first to deploy, leaving for England in March, but the Douglas C-124 Globemaster II aircraft carrying General Cullen and his staff ditched in the Atlantic, leaving no survivors.  General Old hastily flew to England, where he took command of the 7th Division until Maj Gen John P. McConnell could arrive.  Once a new commander was appointed in May, General Old and his staff left for Morocco.

The division controlled deployed bombardment and reconnaissance forces between 1951 and 1965. During the 1950s, SAC's presence in England grew, with nine bases being constructed for the use of SAC bombers, and another six throughout the United Kingdom for support of SAC activities. In 1953, shortly after the death of Stalin, the first Boeing B-47 Stratojets, from the 306th Bombardment Wing, arrived in England for 90 days duty, beginning what would be known as Reflex operations in the United Kingdom.

On 26 July 1956, a Boeing B-47 Stratojet under the division's operational control was practicing touch-and-go landings at RAF Lakenheath crashed into a nuclear weapons storage facility causing damage to several weapons stored at the site.

It participated in alerts, exercises, operational readiness inspections, evaluations, and intensive training programs to provide an advanced combat ready force. It also assumed responsibility for air base construction and improvement, which included building complexes to accommodate bombers, fighters, and special functions such as communications, weapons storage, aircraft parts, and navigational aids.

In September 1957, B-47s in Morocco were put on ground alert, armed, fueled and ready to take off upon notice. This posture was expanded to the bases under the 7th Air Division's command in early 1958. For the remainder of the division's existence, this status, known as Reflex Action (usually shortened to just Reflex), would be the normal status for the Stratojets rotating through England.  The number of 7th Air Division bases used for Reflex reached a peak of nine in early 1959.

The development of Intermediate Range Ballistic Missiles by the Soviet Union made forward bases for SAC medium range bombers increasingly vulnerable.  After 1958, when the 100th Bombardment Wing departed RAF Brize Norton, SAC bombardment wings no longer rotated as entire units, although six bombers continued on alert at each of the division's bomber bases. The number of B-47 wings capable of sending aircraft to Reflex operations at the division's bases began to decline after 1958. The replacement of the medium bomber by the heavy bomber and the intercontinental ballistic missile in the SAC inventory continued into the early 1960s and this removed the need for SAC bases in England, leading to the inactivation of the division in June 1965.

Strategic Air Command in Europe
From 1978, the division was activated in Europe to provide command and control for SAC units assigned to USAFE, primarily air refueling and reconnaissance organizations, but also ground support units such as the 3920th Strategic Wing. It assured that assigned units trained to conduct strategic warfare according to the Emergency War Order. It also assured that assigned units could conduct strategic reconnaissance and air refueling and function as the nucleus of a SAC advanced echelon in event of contingency operations.

7th Air Division in Desert Shield and Desert Storm
Source: Gulf War Air Power Survey Vol V., 21–25.

 801st Air Refueling Wing (Provisional)
 Headquarters: Morón Air Base, Spain 

 801st Bombardment Wing (Provisional)
 Headquarters: Morón Air Base, Spain
 The 801st BW (P) consisted of 28 B-52G Stratofortresses and was formed around a nucleus provided by the 2d Bombardment Wing at Barksdale AFB, Louisiana and drew aircraft from the crews of the 524th BS/379th BW, Wurtsmith AFB, Michigan; the 668th BS/416th BW at Griffiss AFB, New York and from 69th BS/42d BW at Loring AFB, Maine. One B-52G (52-6503) was sent from the 340th BS/97th BW at Eaker AFB, Arkansas.

 802d Air Refueling Wing (Provisional)
 Headquarters: Lajes Field, Azores, Portugal 

 804th Air Refueling Wing (Provisional)
 Headquarters: Incirlik Air Base, Turkey 

 806th Bombardment Wing (Provisional)
 Headquarters: RAF Fairford, England 
 The 806th BW (P) was formed around a cadre of air and ground crews provided by the 97th Bombardment Wing, Eaker AFB, Arkansas. It consisted of a total of 11 B-52G Stratofortresses, also being drawn from the 668th BS/416th BW at Griffiss AFB, New York; 596th BS/2d BW, Barksdale AFB, Louisiana, and the 328th BS/93d BW at Castle AFB, California.

 807th Air Refueling Wing (Provisional)
 Headquarters: Incirlik Air Base, Turkey

 810th Air Refueling Wing (Provisional)
 Headquarters: Incirlik Air Base, Turkey

 4300th Bombardment Wing (Provisional)
 Headquarters: Diego Garcia, British Indian Ocean Territory [BIOT] 
 The lead unit for the 4300th BW (P) was the 69th Bomb Squadron/42d BW from Loring AFB, Maine. Aircraft were also drawn from the 328th BS/93d BW at Castle AFB, California. Six aircraft were transferred to Jeddah, Saudi Arabia, on 17 January 1991 and they were replaced by six B-52Gs from the 1500th SW (P) at Andersen AFB, Guam.

Lineage
 Established as the 7 Fighter Wing on 31 March 1944
 Activated on 21 April 1944
 Redesignated 7 Air Division on 15 December 1947
 Inactivated on 1 May 1948
 Organized on 1 May 1948
 Discontinued on 3 September 1948
 Activated on 20 March 1951
 Inactivated on 16 June 1952
 Organized on 16 June 1952
 Discontinued on 30 June 1965
 Activated on 1 July 1978
 Inactivated on 1 February 1992

Assignments
 Seventh Air Force, 21 April 1944 (attached to VII Fighter Command after 24 April 1944)
 Army Air Forces, Pacific Ocean Area, 15 August 1944
 Provisional Army Air Forces, Middle Pacific, attached 1 July 1945 and assigned, 22 November 1945
 Seventh Air Force (later Pacific Air Command), 1 January 1946 – 1 May 1948
 Pacific Air Command, 1 May – 3 September 1948
 Strategic Air Command, 20 March 1951 – 16 June 1952; 16 June 1952 – 30 June 1965; 1 July 1978
 Strategic Air Command, 16 June 1952 – 30 June 1965
 Strategic Air Command, 1 July 1978
 Eighth Air Force, 31 January 1982 – 1 February 1992

Components
 Wings
 17th Reconnaissance Wing: 1 October 1982 – 30 June 1991
 81st Fighter Wing: 1 May – 3 September 1948
 306th Strategic Wing: 1 July 1978 – 1 February 1992
 706th Strategic Missile Wing: 20 February 1958 – 1 April 1960 (not operational)
 Hickam (later, 6502) Composite Wing: 1 May – 3 September 1948

 Groups
 11th Strategic Group: 15 November 1978 – 7 August 1990
 15th Fighter Group: attached 1 August 1944 – 5 February 1945; attached 30 November 1945 – 1 March 1946; assigned 22 April – 15 October 1946
 21st Fighter Group: assigned 3 July – 10 November 1944, attached 10 November 1944 – 9 February 1945
 30th Bombardment Group: 15 August 1945 – 1 March 1946 (not operational 15 February – 1 March 1946)
 81st Fighter Group: 15 October 1946 – 1 May 1948
 508th Fighter Group: attached 6 January – 25 November 1945

 Squadrons
 6th Night Fighter Squadron: attached 27 September – 11 December 1944; assigned 12 May 1945 – 1 March 1946; assigned 22 April – 31 May 1946
 19th Surveillance Squadron: 1 December 1979 – 1 May 1983
 41st Photographic Reconnaissance Squadron: 18 April – 13 June 1945
 43d Reconnaissance Squadron: attached 20 September 1945 – 22 February 1946 (further attached to 30 Bombardment Group for same period)
 305th Fighter Control Squadron, 15 August 1944 – 14 July 1945
 548th Night Fighter Squadron: 16 September – 20 October 1944
 549th Night Fighter Squadron: 20 October – 1 November 1944

Stations
 Fort Shafter, Hawaii, 21 April 1944
 Wheeler Field (later Wheeler Army Air Base, Wheeler Air Force Base), Hawaii, 18 November 1946 – 1 May 1948
 Hickam Air Force Base, Hawaii, 1 May 1948 – 3 September 1948
 RAF South Ruislip, England, 20 March 1951 – 16 June 1952; 16 June 1952
 U.S. Air Base High Wycombe (later, High Wycombe Air Station), England, 1 July 1958 – 30 June 1965
 Ramstein Air Base, Germany, 1 July 1978 – 1 February 1992

Aircraft 

 Douglas A-24 Banshee: 1944
 Douglas RA-24 Banshee: 1944–1945
 Consolidated B-24 Liberator: 1944–1945, 1945–1946
 Consolidated F-7 Liberator: 1945–1946
 North American B-25 Mitchell: 1944–1945
 North American TB-25 Mitchell: 1945
 Martin B-26 Marauder: 1944–1945
 Lockheed P-38 Lightning: 1944–1945
 Lockheed F-5 Lightning: 1945
 Bell P-39 Airacobra: 1944
 Curtiss P-40 Warhawk: 1944
 Republic P-47 Thunderbolt (later F-47): 1944–1945, 1948
 North American P-51 Mustang: 1944–1946, 1946–1947
 Northrop P-61 Black Widow 1944–1946
 Douglas P-70 Havoc: 1944
 UC-7 [sic]: 1944–1945
 Douglas A-26 Invader (later B-26): 1945–1946, 1948
 Boeing B-17 Flying Fortress: 1945–1946
 Boeing TB-17 Flying Fortress: 1945–1946
 Boeing ERB-17 Flying Fortreaa: 1946
 Boeing SB-17 Flying Fortress: 1948.
 CQ-3 Expeditor: 1945
 Stinson L-5 Sentinel: 1945–1946
 Culver PQ-14 Cadet: 1945–1946
 Curtiss C-46 Commando: 1948
 Douglas C-54 Skymaster: 1948
 Stinson L-5 Sentinel: 1948;
 Boeing B-29 Superfortress: 1951–1953
 Boeing KB-29 Superfortress: 1951–1953
 Boeing RB-29 Superfortress: 1951–1952
 Boeing ERB-29 Superfortress: 1955–1956
 North American B-45 Tornado: 1951–1952;
 North American RB-45 Tornado: 1951–1952;
 Boeing B-50 Superfortress: 1952–1956
 Boeing RB-50 Superfortress: 1952–1956
 Republic F-84 Thunderjet: 1951, 1953, 1955
 Convair B-36 Peacemaker: 1952–1956
 Convair RB-36 Peacemaker: 1951–1954
 Douglas C-47 Skytrain: 1952–1953;
 Boeing B-47 Stratojet: 1953–1965;
 Boeing RB-47 Stratojet: 1954, 1956–1965;
 Boeing KC-97 Stratofreighter: 1953–1958, 1962–1964
 Martin RB-57 Canberra: 1959
 Lockheed U-2: 1962
 Convair B-58 Hustler: 1964

After activation on 1 July 1978, the division controlled aircraft such as the: KC-135 Stratotanker, B-52 Stratofortress, RC-135V/W Rivet Joint, SR-71 Blackbird, and U-2 Dragon Lady.

See also
 List of United States Air Force air divisions

References

Notes

Bibliography

 
 
 
 

007
Units and formations of Strategic Air Command